The 1999 Arab Athletics Championships was the eleventh edition of the international athletics competition between Arab countries. It took place in Beirut, Lebanon from 21–24 October. A total of 41 events were contested, 22 for men and 19 for women. The men's and women's racewalk events were not held due to lack or participation, as was the women's heptathlon. Only Egypt, Lebanon and Syria participated in the women's events.

Medal summary

Men

Women

Medal table

Overall

Men

Women

References

Results
 Al Batal Al Arabi(N°:49). Arab Athletics Union. Retrieved on 2013-11-12.

Arab Athletics Championships
International athletics competitions hosted by Lebanon
Sports competitions in Beirut
Arab Athletics Championships
Arab Athletics Championships
October 1999 sports events in Asia
1990s in Beirut
Events at Camille Chamoun Sports City Stadium